Kongarpalayam is a panchayat village in Gobichettipalayam taluk in Erode District of Tamil Nadu state, India. It is about 16 km from Gobichettipalayam and  km from district headquarters Erode. The village is located on the road connecting Gobichettipalayam with Sathyamangalam via Vaniputhur. Kongarpalayam has a population of about 5346.

References

Villages in Erode district